A District Development Council (abbreviated as DDC), is a form of elected local government in Jammu and Kashmir facilitated by the Jammu and Kashmir Panchayati Raj Act, 1989 and created under Jammu and Kashmir Panchayati Raj Rule, 1996 of the constitution of India. They are primarily aimed at electing the members from the rural and urban areas for the District Planning Committee and the councils themselves with fourteen members from each district for speedy development and economic upliftment.

Each council have additional district development commissioner (Additional D. C.) as chief executive officer and the chairperson of the council representing the district. It works at district-level for the term of five years until new DDC elections are announced or held. It also replaced District Planning and Development Boards (DDB), which was implemented in erstwhile state of Jammu and Kashmir in 1954 to perform its functions such as formulation of periodic and annual plans for the development of a district.

Background 
District Development Councils were first introduced by the Ministry of Home Affairs on 16 October 2020, fourteen months after the special status of Jammu and Kashmir was revoked by the parliament of India on 5 August 2019, leading the government of India to limit the powers of the Jammu and Kashmir Legislative Assembly and to run the union territory under the union government's rule administered by a lieutenant governor.

DDCs supervises, implement, sponsor and prepare for five main fields such as welfare, health, education, finance, public works and development intended to ensure the community development of a representing district.

DDCs before 2020 elections 
DDCs have been existent in Jammu and Kashmir before the 2020 elections in the form of District Planning and Development Boards, but their members were not elected and rather selected by the state government of the erstwhile state of Jammu and Kashmir. In 2020, Government of India decided to hold elections to these councils in order to bring more democracy at the Panchayati raj level and have its members more accountable to the people.

2020 DDC elections 
The first DDC elections in the history of Jammu and Kashmir were held from 28 November 2020 in eight phases across the two-hundred and eighty DDC constituencies. People's Alliance for Gupkar Declaration (PAGD) won 110 seats while BJP emerged as the single largest party by winning 75 seats. But later on 19 January, the JKPC left the PAGD, which brought down the PAGD's seat tally from 110 to 102, as JKPC had won 8 seats.

Some of the opposition's leaders of Jammu and Kashmir were arrested under detention laws prior to the elections.

The counting of votes in two DDC constituencies has been kept in abeyance as two of the candidates in them are reportedly from Pakistani administered Azad Kashmir.

DDC Chairman 
Every DDC consists of a DDC Chairman and Vice-Chairman. The elections for this post in each DDC began from 6 February 2021 till 20 February 2021. Since each DDC has 14 members, the winning candidate requires the support of minimum 8 DDC members in that council. The election for this post also requires quorum which is minimum of 10 members for the election to take place.

Defections of elected candidates 
The elected members of DDC defected from one party to another as the process of voting for the post of DDC Chairman and Vice-Chairman began. 2 elected DDC members from Jammu & Kashmir National Conference left the party and joined Jammu and Kashmir Apni Party. Apart from this several independent DDC members also joined Jammu and Kashmir Apni Party before the voting for DDC Chairman had begun.

Composition 
DDC works jointly with District Planning Committee (DPC) and Block Development Council from each district. A council consists of fourteen members elected from the countryside and also from the built-up areas where needed or approved by the Election Commission of India. Its chairperson and vice-chairperson are selected by its members; however all the elected members, including chairperson and vice-chairperson are literally headed by a government revenue officer such as additional district development commissioner.

Since it works jointly with the other committees or councils, a jurisdiction's DDC consists of a member of parliament, member of state legislator, chairperson of town hall or municipal committee, and the president of a municipal corporation.

DDC Chairpersons

Members
Source:

Kashmir Division

Anantnag DDC 
 Chairperson: Yousuf Gorsi (JKNC)
 Vice-chairpwrson: Javaid Ahmad (JKPDP)

Budgam DDC

Bandipora DDC

Functions 
 To formulate, prepare, approve a plan or capital expenditure for respective districts
 To organize general meetings after every three months designed to suggest a new plan or to process pending plans
 To supervise the activities of gram panchayats, Block Development Council and panchayat samiti in its own jurisdiction at district-level
 To utilize the development aid or government funds for the development of an entire district
 To implement the schemes sponsored by the government of India
 To receive the district development plans compiled and formulated by the Block Development Council and submit it to the District Planning Committee "for adherence to the government guidelines, norms and rules"

References

Further reading 
 

Constitution of India
Elections in Jammu and Kashmir
 
Politics of Jammu and Kashmir